The 2017 World Rugby Nations Cup was the twelfth edition of the World Rugby Nations Cup rugby union tournament, created by World Rugby. It was the first ever tournament to be played outside of Romania and without their national team, with Uruguay hosting the competition.

Like in 2016, the tournament featured six teams split in two pools of three, where the three European teams; Emerging Italy, Russia and Spain played the other three teams; Argentina XV, Namibia and Uruguay.

Hosts Uruguay won the tournament, the first time they had done so in five previous attempts. It is the third year in a row where the hosts capitalized on the home advantage to claim the title, with previous hosts Romania winning in 2015 and 2016.

Teams
Below are the competing teams with their World Rugby Rankings as of the first tournament date (10 June 2017):
  (n/a)
  (n/a)
  (19)
  (20)
  (18)
  (21)

Standings

Pool A

Pool B

Fixtures

Matchday 1

Notes:
 Lesley Klim, Johan Retief and Mahepisa Tjeriko (all Namibia) and Jean-Baptiste Custoja, Fred Quercy, Andrea Rabago and Afa Tauli (all Spain) made their international debuts.

Notes:
 This was the first ever time that Russia has beaten Argentina XV (formally known as Argentina Jaguars).
 Kirill Gubin (Russia) made his international debut.

Notes:
 Agustín Della Corte (Uruguay) made his international debut.

Matchday 2

Notes:
 Emiliano Calle, Inaki Mateu and Tomás Munilla (all Spain) made their international debut.

Notes:
 Alexander Budychenko and Evgeni Nepeivoda (both Russia) made their international debuts.

Matchday 3

Notes:
 Justin Newman and Cliven Loubser (both Namibia) and Evgeni Mishechkin (Russia) made their international debuts.

See also
 World Rugby Nations Cup
 2017 mid-year rugby union internationals

External links
Official Site 2017

References

2017
2017 rugby union tournaments for national teams
International rugby union competitions hosted by Uruguay
2017 in Russian rugby union
2016–17 in Spanish rugby union
2016–17 in Italian rugby union
2017 in Argentine rugby union
rugby union
rugby union
Sports competitions in Montevideo
June 2017 sports events in South America